Heracles Peninsula is a triangular headland in Black Sea at the southwestern portion of Crimea. It is distinguished by its northern edge at the Bay of Sevastopol (continuing by Chorna River) and its eastern edge at the Balaklava Bay (including the Valley of Balaklava). Most of the peninsula is heavily urbanized and occupied by the city of Sevastopol.

The name reminiscent with a divine hero of the Ancient Greece has in fact derived from another ancient Greek city Heraclea Pontica (today Karadeniz Ereğli (Turkish variant)). The Greek colonists founded the ancient city of Chersonesus, the ruins of which to this day may be found in Sevastopol. Other names of the peninsula include Trachea or Irakli. The peninsula was an agricultural district of Chersonesus also known as Chora.

The peninsula represents itself as a rocky plateau (high plain) that is dissected by gulches and gently descends from the Sapun mountain to Black Sea.

References 

Landforms of Sevastopol
Peninsulas of Ukraine
Peninsulas of Russia